Khương Thị Hồng Nhung (born 2 January 1972) is a Vietnamese chess player who holds the title of Woman International Master.

Biography
In 1991, Khương Thị Hồng Nhung participated in Women's World Chess Championship Interzonal Tournament in Subotica where ranked 33rd place.

In 1994, she was awarded the FIDE Woman International Master (WIM) title.

References

External links
 
 

1972 births
Living people
Vietnamese chess players
Chess Woman International Masters